John McKee (born 15 February 2000) is an Irish rugby union player, currently playing for United Rugby Championship and European Rugby Champions Cup side Leinster. His preferred position is hooker.

Leinster
McKee was named in the Leinster Rugby academy for the 2021–22 season.

References

External links
itsrugby.co.uk Profile

2000 births
Living people
Rugby union players from Belfast
Irish rugby union players
Leinster Rugby players
Rugby union hookers